Home for the Holidays is a 1995 American family comedy-drama film directed by Jodie Foster and produced by Peggy Rajski and Foster. The screenplay was written by W. D. Richter, based on a short story by Chris Radant. The film's score was composed by Mark Isham. The film follows Claudia Larson, who after losing her job, kissing her ex-boss, and finding out that her daughter has plans of her own for the holidays, departs Chicago to spend her Thanksgiving with her dysfunctional family.

The film features an ensemble cast, including Holly Hunter, Robert Downey Jr., Anne Bancroft, Charles Durning, Dylan McDermott, Geraldine Chaplin, Steve Guttenberg, Cynthia Stevenson, Claire Danes, Austin Pendleton, and David Strathairn.

Home for the Holidays was released theatrically on November 3, 1995, by Paramount Pictures in North America and by PolyGram Filmed Entertainment worldwide. The film received mixed reviews from critics who appreciated Foster's direction, and Hunter's and Downey's performances but criticised the screenplay. The film grossed $22.1 million against a budget of $20 million.

Plot
Claudia Larson is a single mother who has just been fired from her job. She flies from Chicago to spend Thanksgiving at the Baltimore home of her parents, Adele and Henry, while her only child decides to stay home and spend the holiday with her boyfriend. While on the plane, Claudia makes a phone call to Tommy, her younger brother and confidant, who she believes won't be attending the Thanksgiving dinner, and unloads her problems.

Claudia arrives in Baltimore at her parent’s home. That night, Tommy arrives with his friend Leo Fish, whom Claudia believes to be his boyfriend. Claudia is glad to see her brother but fears that he and Jack, his boyfriend, have broken up. The next day while in town, Claudia runs into a girl she used to go to school with and feels diminished by talk of her divorce. Leo comes to her aid.

On Thanksgiving Day, eccentric Aunt Glady (Adele's sister), who is showing signs of dementia, professes her love for Henry. Shortly after, Tommy accidentally drops the turkey all over he and Claudia’s conservative sister Joanne resulting in an argument in which she reveals to everyone that Tommy had married Jack in a beach wedding several months ago.

After the meal, Tommy, Leo, Joanne’s husband Walter and son Walter Jr. play football and, frustrated by the game, the brothers-in-law begin to fight. Walter wrestles Tommy onto the ground, and Tommy accidentally punches Leo who's trying to break them up. Henry sprays his them with the hose, and Walter leaves with his wife and children. 

The family returns inside, where Henry answers the ringing phone; it turns out to be Jack calling. Before handing the phone over to Tommy, Henry says that he's happy for both of them. Their conversation reveals they are still happily together. Claudia and Leo drive Aunt Glady home, then deliver leftovers to Joanne's family. In the car, Leo tells Claudia that Tommy showed him a picture of her, and he came to Thanksgiving to meet her. They kiss.

Arriving back at Claudia’s parents’ home, Leo and Claudia begin to make out in the living room, but Tommy, reminds Leo that they have to get an early start in the morning. The next day, Claudia wakes up and sees Tommy and Leo driving away and heads to the airport herself shortly after. Before the plane takes off, Leo gets in the seat next to her, and they fly back to Chicago together.

Cast

Production

Screenwriter W. D. Richter adapted a short story by Chris Radant that appeared in the Boston Phoenix. Executive producer Stuart Kleinman sent Jodie Foster the screenplay with a note that said, "It's a complete mess and I love it." Foster agreed and decided that it would be her second directorial effort (the first was Little Man Tate). Castle Rock Entertainment was originally going to finance the film but canceled. Foster's own production company, Egg Pictures, acquired Richter's screenplay. She struck a deal with Paramount Pictures to distribute the film theatrically and PolyGram Filmed Entertainment to handle the international rights and domestic video and pay television. These rights now belong to Metro-Goldwyn-Mayer (MGM) through their acquisition of PolyGram's pre-1996 library.

Foster said, "The great challenge was to find a beautiful idea to pull through it, a narrative line that would make the story work." Foster met with Richter and together they brainstormed and "had great fun thinking up new details and lives and clearing up the relationships," Foster remembers. They worked on the script so that the film reflected Foster's point of view and her own life experiences. She showed the first draft to Holly Hunter who agreed to star after reading it. Working with a $20 million budget, Foster spent ten weeks filming in Baltimore with a two-week rehearsal period. She used this time to get input from the actors about dialogue. If a scene of speech did not ring true, she wanted to know. She picked the city because it was the "prototype of the American city. It's dangerous, east coasty, urban. Yet it still has a hopeful quality to it." Principal photography began in February 1995. Filming of the Thanksgiving dinner took more than ten days, using 64 turkeys, 20 pounds of mashed potatoes, 35 pounds of stuffing, 44 pies, 30 pounds of sweet potatoes, 18 bags of mini-marshmallows and 50 gallons of juice that stood in for wine. Foster allowed Robert Downey Jr. to improvise, which got him excited about making films again after a period of time where he became disillusioned with acting.

Soundtrack

 Rusted Root – "Evil Ways" 4:03
 Mark Isham – "Holiday Blues" 4:46
 Nat King Cole – "Candy" 3:51
 Tom Jones – "It's Not Unusual" 2:01
 Mark Isham – "Blue Nights" 9:25
 Mark Isham – "Birth of the Cool Whip" 2:53
 Dinah Washington – "Trouble in Mind" 2:50
 Mark Isham – "Late Night Blues" 4:59
 Mark Isham – "Medley of the Very Thought of You/With Us Alone" 2:42
 Ray Noble – "The Very Thought of You" 4:25
 Nat King Cole – "The Very Thought of You" 3:47
 Janis Joplin – "Piece of My Heart" 4:14

Reception

Box office
Home for the Holidays was released on November 3, 1995 in 1,000 theaters and grossed US$4 million in its opening weekend. It went on to make $17.5 million in North America. The film earned a further $4.7 million internationally for a worldwide total of $22.1 million.

Critical response
On Rotten Tomatoes Home for the Holidays has an approval rating of 64% based on reviews from 50 critics. The site's consensus states: "Much like a real-life visit Home for the Holidays, this Thanksgiving-set dramedy can get a little bumpy – but it also has its share of fondly memorable moments." On Metacritic the film has a score of 56 out of 100 based on reviews from 15 critics. Audiences surveyed by CinemaScore gave the film a grade C+ on scale of A to F.

In his three and half star review, Roger Ebert praised Foster's ability to direct "the film with a sure eye for the revealing little natural moment," and Downey's performance that "brings out all the complexities of a character who has used a quick wit to keep the world's hurts at arm's length." Janet Maslin, in her review for The New York Times, praised Holly Hunter's performance: "Displaying a dizziness more mannered than the cool, crisp intelligence she shows in Copycat, Ms. Hunter still holds together Home for the Holidays with a sympathetic performance." In his review for the Boston Globe, Jay Carr praised the film for being "filled with juicy performances that expand resourcefully beyond what we think are going to be their boundaries, the film carries us beyond our expectations. That's what makes it so pleasurable."

USA Today gave the film three out of four stars and wrote, "Home has the usual hellish ritual. They come, they eat, they argue, they leave. It's the stuffing in-between that makes it special." However, in her review for The Washington Post, Rita Kempley criticized some of the performances: "Downey brings a lot of energy to the role, but his antics can be both tedious and distracting. Hunter has a lovely scene with her disgruntled sister, but there's no time for that relationship to develop, what with a romantic interest yet to explore." In his review for Rolling Stone magazine, Peter Travers had problems with the screenplay: "It's a shame that W.D. Richter's un-Disney-ish script often slides into shrill stereotypes and sitcom silliness."

Notes

References

External links
 
 
 
Home for the Holidays at Rotten Tomatoes
 An excerpt from the original short story
 Author Chris Radant's experience working on the film

1995 films
1995 comedy-drama films
American comedy-drama films
Films about dysfunctional families
Films about vacationing
American LGBT-related films
1995 LGBT-related films
LGBT-related comedy-drama films
Films directed by Jodie Foster
Films set in Baltimore
Films shot in Baltimore
Paramount Pictures films
PolyGram Filmed Entertainment films
Films with screenplays by W. D. Richter
Films based on short fiction
Thanksgiving in films
American black comedy films
Films scored by Mark Isham
1990s black comedy films
1990s English-language films
1990s American films